Lynley Herbert Weston (1 September 1892 – 2 November 1963) was a New Zealand rugby union player.

Early life
Weston was born in Auckland in 1892 to Stephen James Weston. He had two brothers and three sisters. His elder brother, Stan Weston, also played rugby union.

Playing career
A five five-eighth, Weston represented Auckland and North Auckland at a provincial level, and was a member of the New Zealand national side, the All Blacks, on their 1914 tour of Australia. However, hampered by injury, he only played in one match on that tour, against Queensland.

Later life
During World War I, Weston served with the New Zealand Field Engineers in Egypt between 1915 and 1916, rising to the rank of corporal. He was invalided back to New Zealand in 1916 and discharged as medically unfit for service.

Lyn and Stan Weston were both garage proprietors in Whangārei in the 1930s. Weston died in Whangārei on 2 November 1963, and he was buried in Maunu Cemetery.

References

1892 births
1963 deaths
Rugby union players from Auckland
New Zealand rugby union players
New Zealand international rugby union players
Auckland rugby union players
Northland rugby union players
Rugby union fly-halves
New Zealand military personnel of World War I
Burials at Maunu Cemetery